Paul Donald Henare (born 4 March 1979) is a New Zealand professional basketball coach and former player.

Junior career
Henare attended Napier Boys' High School and played one season of college basketball for Utah Valley State College. He played for New Zealand at U/16, U/18 and U/20 junior levels.

Professional career

New Zealand NBL
Henare began his playing career in 1995 with the Hawke's Bay Hawks. After three seasons with the Hawks, he joined the Auckland Stars, where he won championships in 1999 and 2000. He returned to Hawke's Bay in 2002 and played the next seven seasons there, helping the Hawks win their inaugural championship in 2006. In 2009, he played for the Christchurch Cougars, and in 2010, he played his final season with the Hawks. On 30 May 2014, Henare came out of retirement to be the temporary player/coach of the Southland Sharks after multiple players were suspended.

New Zealand Breakers and overseas
After a season abroad in Serbia with OKK Beograd in 2002–03, Henare debuted with the New Zealand Breakers in their inaugural season in the NBL in 2003–04. In 2006, he had his second overseas stint, this time in Turkey with Banvit B.K.

In 2010–11, Henare was a member of the Breakers' maiden championship-winning team. He subsequently retired from the Breakers after eight seasons and was honoured by becoming the first Breakers player to have his number (32) retired.

National team
Henare debuted for the Tall Blacks in 1998, with his first major tournament being the Sydney Olympics in 2000. His final outing with the Tall Blacks came in 2007 with the FIBA Oceania Championship.

Coaching career

New Zealand NBL
Henare made his coaching debut in 2011 as head coach of the Hawke's Bay Hawks. After two seasons with the Hawks, he served as head coach of the Southland Sharks in 2013, 2014 and 2015, winning championships in 2013 and 2015. In 2019, he returned to the New Zealand NBL for the first time since 2015, coaching the Wellington Saints to the championship.

Australian NBL
Between 2013 and 2016, Henare served as an assistant coach with the New Zealand Breakers. He was promoted to head coach for the 2016–17 season, but after two seasons, he stepped down from the role.

For the 2018–19 NBL season, Henare served as an assistant coach with Melbourne United. He departed United in October 2019 to take up a head coaching opportunity in Japan.

National team
Between 2012 and 2015, Henare served as an assistant coach with the New Zealand Tall Blacks. Between 2015 and 2019, he served as head coach of the Tall Blacks.

Japan
In October 2019, Henare signed a three-year deal as head coach of Japanese second division club, Kagawa Five Arrows.

References

External links
NBL stats
2006 FIBA World Championship profile

1979 births
Living people
Auckland Stars players
Bandırma B.İ.K. players
Basketball players at the 2000 Summer Olympics
Basketball players at the 2004 Summer Olympics
Basketball players at the 2006 Commonwealth Games
Christchurch Cougars players
Commonwealth Games medallists in basketball
Commonwealth Games silver medallists for New Zealand
Hawke's Bay Hawks players
Junior college men's basketball players in the United States
New Zealand men's basketball players
New Zealand Breakers players
New Zealand expatriate basketball people in Australia
New Zealand expatriate basketball people in Japan
New Zealand expatriate basketball people in Serbia
New Zealand expatriate basketball people in Turkey
New Zealand expatriate basketball people in the United States
Olympic basketball players of New Zealand
OKK Beograd players
People educated at Napier Boys' High School
Sportspeople from Napier, New Zealand
Point guards
Southland Sharks players
Utah Valley Wolverines men's basketball players
2006 FIBA World Championship players
2002 FIBA World Championship players
New Zealand basketball coaches
Medallists at the 2006 Commonwealth Games